Mottron is a French singer and songwriter was born on March 27, 1987, in Tours France.

Style
Mottron's music is influenced by many backgrounds such as classical music, jazz, pop, folk music as well as minimal techno which he uses to create a unique mixture of composition and arrangements

Mottron has so far released 3 records under his own name and one with the project Malnoïa.

Discography

Studio work

Home Safe (2014)
"Lust"
"What would happen"
"Indecent"
"O Father"
"They Know"

Colorful! (2013)
"Colorful"
"Solar Ray"
"Sleep"
"Glass Bowl"

Endure and Survive (2012)
"Bone from the world's chest"
"I Surrender"
"Curves"
"Comfortable"
"Painted life"

Surface of Arts (2009)
"Time's"
"Curtains down"
"Carrousel"
"Bohemian intermission"
"The bridge of sighs"
"Another moral dilemma"
"Schism"
"Pandora's box"
"Twinkle"
"I killed music"
"Inyaworda-Nayo"
"Surface of art"

Singles

"They Know" (2014)
"Sleep" (2013)
"Colorful!" (2013)
"Bone From the World's Chest" (2012)
"Curves" (2012)
"Time's" (2009)

References

French singer-songwriters
French people of Canadian descent
1987 births
Living people
21st-century French singers